Michael Bond is a South African politician and a Member of the National Assembly of South Africa for the Democratic Alliance (DA).

Political career
Bond was elected to the uMgungundlovu District Municipality council in 2000 as a member of the Democratic Alliance. In 2012, Bond stood for DA provincial leader against incumbent Sizwe Mchunu. Bond withdrew and endorsed Ziba Jiyane, who lost to Mchunu. In 2021, Bond was re-elected as a uMgungundlovu District Councillor and became the ward councillor for ward 25 in the Msunduzi Local Municipality as well.

On 9 November 2022, Bond vacated his position on the uMgungundlovu District Council after 22 years and resigned as the ward councillor for ward 25 in Msunduzi as well. He had been appointed a Member of Parliament for the DA with effect from 10 November. Bond was sworn in as a member of the National Assembly on 16 November 2022.

References

Living people
Year of birth missing (living people)
People from Pietermaritzburg
Democratic Alliance (South Africa) politicians
Members of the National Assembly of South Africa